

204001–204100 

|-bgcolor=#f2f2f2
| colspan=4 align=center | 
|}

204101–204200 

|-bgcolor=#f2f2f2
| colspan=4 align=center | 
|}

204201–204300 

|-bgcolor=#f2f2f2
| colspan=4 align=center | 
|}

204301–204400 

|-id=370
| 204370 Ferdinandvaněk ||  || Ferdinand Vaněk, a fictitious character in the play Audience by Czech writer, philosopher and dissident Václav Havel || 
|}

204401–204500 

|-bgcolor=#f2f2f2
| colspan=4 align=center | 
|}

204501–204600 

|-bgcolor=#f2f2f2
| colspan=4 align=center | 
|}

204601–204700 

|-bgcolor=#f2f2f2
| colspan=4 align=center | 
|}

204701–204800 

|-id=702
| 204702 Péquignat ||  ||  (1669–1740), one of the most popular heroes for people living in Jura Switzerland. || 
|-id=710
| 204710 Gaoxing || 2006 GE || Gao Xing (born 1974), a Chinese amateur astronomer and founder of the Xingming Observatory  of Ürümqi. || 
|-id=711
| 204711 Luojialun || 2006 GN || Luo Jialun (1897–1969) was a Chinese educator, historian, thinker and diplomat. He was President of National Central University from 1932 to 1941. || 
|-id=786
| 204786 Wehlau ||  || William Henry Wehlau (1926–1995), an American-born Canadian astronomer || 
|}

204801–204900 

|-id=805
| 204805 Šipöcz ||  || Tibor Šipöcz (born 1950) is a Slovak physicist and senior lecturer, formerly at the Faculty of Mathematics, Physics and Informatics, Comenius University in Bratislava. || 
|-id=816
| 204816 Andreacamilleri || 2007 OZ || Andrea Camilleri (1925–2019), an Italian writer, screenwriter and director who received a number of honorary degrees from several Italian universities || 
|-id=831
| 204831 Levski ||  || Vasil Levski (1837–1873), national hero of Bulgaria and styled the Apostle of Freedom. || 
|-id=836
| 204836 Xiexiaosi ||  || Xie Xiaosi (1905–2008), known as the Guardian of World Cultural Heritage, was a famous Chinese garden landscape artist and painter. || 
|-id=839
| 204839 Suzhouyuanlin ||  || Suzhou Yuanlin, Suzhou Chinese-style gardens, are typical ancient gardens with traditional Chinese architectures and cultures. || 
|-id=842
| 204842 Fengchia ||  || Feng Chia University, located in central Taiwan, is a university characterized by educational excellence and breakthrough research. || 
|-id=852
| 204852 Frankfurt ||  || The German city of Frankfurt in Hesse || 
|-id=873
| 204873 FAIR ||  || The Facility for Antiproton and Ion Research (FAIR), an international science center for studying the building blocks of matter and the evolution of the universe || 
|-id=896
| 204896 Giorgiobocca ||  || Giorgio Bocca (1920–2011), an Italian essayist and journalist, also known  for his participation in the World War II partisan movement. || 
|}

204901–205000 

|-bgcolor=#f2f2f2
| colspan=4 align=center | 
|}

References 

204001-205000